Anucha Chaiyawong is a Thai footballer who played for Thailand Premier League team Provincial Electricity Authority FC in 2007 and won the Thailand Premier League in 2008 with PEA FC. His other former teams includes TTM Samut Sakhon and Chiangmai F.C.

He plays for Nan F.C. in 2017 season.

Honours
 Thailand Premier League 2008

References

Living people
Anucha Chaiyawong
1985 births
Association football forwards
Anucha Chaiyawong